Cove Hot Springs is a pool constructed over a natural hot spring in the Grande Ronde Valley of northeastern Oregon, U.S.  The  water flows at  per minute which replaces the  pool several times per day.

References 

Hot springs of Oregon
Bodies of water of Union County, Oregon